Idiofa Airport  is an airport serving Idiofa, a city in Kwilu Province, Democratic Republic of the Congo.

See also

 Transport in the Democratic Republic of the Congo
 List of airports in the Democratic Republic of the Congo

References

External links
 FallingRain - Idiofa Airport
 OpenStreetMap - Idiofa Airport
 OurAirports - Idiofa Airport
 

Airports in Kwilu Province